Condylonucula is a genus of bivalves belonging to the family Nuculidae.

The species of this genus are found in Central America and Northwestern Africa.

Species:

Condylonucula bicornis 
Condylonucula cynthiae 
Condylonucula maya

References

Nuculidae
Bivalve genera